Kofan is a rural commune in the Cercle of Sikasso in the Sikasso Region of southern Mali. The commune covers an area of 283 square kilometers and includes a small town and 7 villages. In the 2009 census it had a population of 10,236. The administrative center of the commune, the  chef-lieu, is the small town of Kafana. The town is 68 km northwest of Sikasso.

References

External links
.

Communes of Sikasso Region